Tom Horn is a 1980 American Western film directed by William Wiard and starring Steve McQueen as the legendary lawman, outlaw, and gunfighter Tom Horn. It was based on Horn's own writings.

Plot
Tom Horn, a legendary frontier scout and tracker who helped capture Geronimo, drifts around the quickly disappearing western frontier. The story begins as he rides into a small town and provokes prizefighter Jim Corbett, ending up in a livery stable, unconscious and badly bruised.

Cattle company owner John Coble finds Horn in the livery, and offers him the use of his ranch to recuperate. He also offers him work investigating and deterring cattle rustlers who steal from the grazing association to which Coble belongs. He implies that the association will support Horn in implementing vigilante justice. Horn accepts the offer, and receives the approval of U.S. marshal Joe Belle at an association picnic, where he also catches the eye of Glendolene, the local schoolteacher.

Calling himself a "stock detective", Horn confronts cowboys at an auction whose cattle bear Coble's brand. After giving them fair warning, he goes on a one-man crusade to kill or otherwise drive off anyone who rustles the cattle of his benefactors.

Horn's methods are brutal but effective. After a public gunfight, the local townspeople become alarmed at his violent nature, and public opinion turns against him. The owners of the large cattle companies realize that while he is doing exactly what they hired him to do, his tactics will ultimately tarnish their image, so they begin to plot his demise. Joe Belle, who has political ambitions, wants Horn out of the way for the same reasons. Their conspiracy is set in motion when a young boy tending sheep is shot by a .45–60, the same caliber rifle Tom Horn is known to use.

Horn is slow to realize that he is being set up. Proud and convinced of his own innocence, he refuses to leave the county or avoid the town. Glendolene and Coble try to warn him to be careful, but Horn ignores the warning. Joe Belle coaxes Horn from a saloon and back to his office, where a man transcribing their conversation is hidden in the next room. Horn does not admit to the murders but states that "If I did shoot that boy, it was the best shot I ever made." Based on this conversation, Horn is taken prisoner.

Unaccustomed to being unable to come and go as he pleases into his beloved hills, Horn seems lost. He breaks out of jail and attempts to flee. He is recaptured and convicted based on the testimony of the newspaperman who skewed the conversation between Belle and Horn.

As his execution nears, Horn accepts his fate and remains resolved in the moments before he is hanged.

Cast
 Steve McQueen as Tom Horn
 Linda Evans as Glendolene Kimmel
 Richard Farnsworth as John C. Coble
 Billy Green Bush as U.S. Marshal Joe Belle
 Slim Pickens as Sheriff Sam Creedmore
 Peter Canon as Assistant Prosecutor
 Elisha Cook as Stablehand
 Roy Jenson as Lee Mendenhour
 James Kline as Arlo Chance
 Geoffrey Lewis as Walter Stoll
 Harry Northup as Thomas Burke
 Steve Oliver as Jim 'Gentleman Jim' Corbett
 Bill Thurman as Ora Haley
 Bert Williams as Judge
 Bobby Bass as Corbett's Bodyguard
 Mickey Jones as Brown's Hole Rustler
 Mel Novak as Corbett's Bodyguard
 Clark Coleman as Jimmy Nolt
 Drummond Barclay as Charlie Ohnhouse
 Chuck Hayward as Deputy Earl Proctor

Production
Since the troubled production and disastrous release of An Enemy of the People, McQueen had once again struggled to find work. He priced himself out of roles in a  Towering Inferno sequel and Raise the Titanic, was rejected for the Salkinds' Superman film due to his growing weight, turned down a role in Close Encounters of the Third Kind, and walked out on Richard Fleischer's planned adaptation of Tai-Pan when the second $1 million installment of his announced $10 million fee failed to arrive (the actor had earned $1 million for no work already). After his divorce from Ali MacGraw, though, McQueen decided to get back into films. He initially wanted to adapt Harold Pinter's play Old Times, but First Artists insisted that he instead film Tom Horn, a script they had owned for some time, as the final film in the star's three-picture deal he had signed with them under Warner Bros.

The film was meant to go into production in 1978, but faced stiff competition, with United Artists planning a film about Horn as a vehicle for Robert Redford. The latter dropped out, and the film about Horn's younger years was made by CBS as a four-hour TV movie titled Mr. Horn with David Carradine. This aired just as the Warner Bros./First Artists film went into production, receiving poor ratings. McQueen ordered several rewrites to the script, while original director Don Siegel left to be replaced by first Elliot Silverstein and then James William Guercio, who was fired after three days by McQueen. McQueen then wanted to direct himself but the Directors Guild of America’s rules forbidding actors from taking over direction once filming had begun scotched these plans, and TV movie director William Wiard was brought in to finish the film. This was Wiard's only credit for directing a feature film.

Postproduction was similarly fraught; the producers attempting both a linear version of the film and then another telling the story in flashback, before settling on the former approach. The film was still being re-edited ahead of its March 1980 release date. It received poor reviews and was another box-office failure. Tom Horn was the first and only McQueen vehicle to receive an R rating.

During production, McQueen had trouble breathing and later was found to have a rare form of lung cancer, malignant mesothelioma.

References

External links
 
 

1980 films
1980 Western (genre) films
1980s biographical films
American biographical films
American Western (genre) films
Biographical films about people of the American Old West
Films scored by Ernest Gold
Films about capital punishment
Films set in the 1900s
First Artists films
Films directed by William Wiard
1980s English-language films
1980s American films